Yadira Alexandra Guamán Maza (born June 8, 1986 in  Cumbaratza, Zamora Chinchipe) is a male race walker from Ecuador.

Personal bests

Track walk
10,000 m: 47:06.40 min –  Guayaquil, 5 July 2014
20,000 m: 1:33:18.0 hrs (ht) –  Buenos Aires, 5 June 2011

Road walk
10 km: 49:00 min –  Havana, 24 April 2009
20 km: 1:34:47 hrs –  London, 11 August 2012

Achievements

References

External links

Sports reference biography

1986 births
Living people
Athletes (track and field) at the 2011 Pan American Games
Ecuadorian female racewalkers
Athletes (track and field) at the 2012 Summer Olympics
Olympic athletes of Ecuador
World Athletics Championships athletes for Ecuador
Pan American Games competitors for Ecuador
Athletes (track and field) at the 2007 Pan American Games
South American Games gold medalists for Ecuador
South American Games medalists in athletics
Competitors at the 2006 South American Games
21st-century Ecuadorian women
20th-century Ecuadorian women